The 2017–18 Russian Premier League was the 26th season of the premier football competition in Russia since the dissolution of the Soviet Union and the 15th under the current Russian Premier League name. Spartak Moscow came into the season as the defending champions.

Teams

As in the previous season, 16 teams played in the 2017–18 season. After the 2016–17 season, FC Orenburg, FC Tom Tomsk and FC Krylia Sovetov Samara were relegated to the 2017–18 Russian National Football League. They were replaced by three clubs from the 2016–17 Russian National Football League, FC Dynamo Moscow, FC Tosno and FC SKA-Khabarovsk. Dynamo returned after one season of absence, while Tosno and SKA-Khabarovsk made their debuts in the Russian top-tier division.

Before the season, FC Terek Grozny changed its name to FC Akhmat Grozny.

Stadiums

Personnel and kits

Managerial changes

Tournament format and regulations

Basic
The 16 teams will play a round-robin tournament whereby each team plays each one of the other teams twice, once at home and once away. Thus, a total of 240 matches will be played, with 30 matches played by each team.

Promotion and relegation
The teams that finish 15th and 16th will be relegated to the FNL, while the top 2 in that league will be promoted to the Premier League for the 2018–19 season.

The 13th and 14th Premier League teams will play the 4th and 3rd FNL teams respectively in two playoff games with the winners securing Premier League spots for the 2018–19 season.

League table

Relegation play-offs
The draw for relegation play-offs scheduling took place on 4 May 2018. The kick-off times were announced on 14 May 2018.

First leg

Second leg

Amkar Perm won 3–0 on aggregate and retained their spot in the 2018–19 Russian Premier League; FC Tambov remained in the 2018–19 Russian National Football League.

Yenisey Krasnoyarsk won 6–4 on aggregate and were promoted to the 2018–19 Russian Premier League; Anzhi Makhachkala were relegated to the 2018–19 Russian National Football League.

On 13 June 2018, FC Amkar Perm announced that the Russian Football Union recalled their 2018–19 season license, making them ineligible for the Russian Premier League or Russian Football National League. The final decision on the club's future will be made on 18 June 2018 at the club's board meeting. As a consequence, Anzhi Makhachkala will not be relegated.

Results

Positions by round
The table lists the positions of teams after each week of matches. In order to preserve chronological evolvements, any postponed matches are not included to the round at which they were originally scheduled, but added to the full round they were played immediately afterwards.

Season statistics

Scoring

Top goalscorers

Last updated: 13 May 2018

Top assists

Season events

Attendances

References

Notes

External links

2017–18 Russian Premier League at Soccerway

Russian Premier League seasons
1
Russian Premier League|Rus